Rachis tulearensis is a species of conical air-breathing land snail, a gastropod mollusk in the family Cerastidae.

Distribution 
Madagascar.

Etymology 
This species is named after Tuléar, a city in Madagascar.

References 

Molluscs of Africa
tulearensis